Khandra is a village in Madlauda tehsil, Panipat sub-district, Panipat district of the Indian state of Haryana. The Pin code of Khandra is 132113.

Demographics 
According to the 2011 Census of India, Khandra's population was 2,153 persons, with 1,181 persons amongst those being male and 972 being female.

Government and politics 
Khandra is administered by the Khandra gram panchayat.

Ecology 
In 2020, special joint action committee constituted under the auspices of the National Green Tribunal to investigate air and water pollution resulting from the activities of the Panipat Refinery. 31 sample sites were chosen for collection of samples of ground water within a radius of 10 km from the refinery. Government school, Khandra was one of them. It was found that the sample collected there contained 0.36 mg/L of fluoride. On the basis of the recommendations of the committee, the refinery was ordered, by the tribunal, to pay a compensation of Rs. 642 crore to those adversely affected by its activities.

Notable people 
Neeraj Chopra: Olympic, Commonwealth, and Asian Games gold medalist.
 Rajveer Chopde: Head of Liaison, Akhil Bharatiya Maratha Jagriti Manch (All India Maratha Awareness Forum)
Shailendra Kumar: Sarpanch of Khandra gram panchayat; according to an Amar Ujala news report, was suspended in November, 2020 for allegedly indulging in financial irregularities and an enquiry ordered against him. In January 2021, he was found guilty, a show cause notice was sent to him, in the event of an unsatisfactory reply, he faces dismissal, reports Dainik Jagran.

References 

Villages in Panipat district